Rafael Azpeitia (born 17 May 1952) is a Mexican water polo player. He competed in the men's tournament at the 1972 Summer Olympics.

References

1952 births
Living people
Mexican male water polo players
Olympic water polo players of Mexico
Water polo players at the 1972 Summer Olympics
Place of birth missing (living people)
20th-century Mexican people